Trần Anh Đức (born 11 May 1991) is a Vietnamese footballer who plays as a goalkeeper for club Công An Nhân Dân.

Honours

Hà Nội 
V.League 1: 2016, 2018
Vietnamese National Cup: Runner-up 2015, 2016
Vietnamese Super Cup: Runners-up 2015, 2016 

Công An Nhân Dân
V.League 2: 2022

References 

1991 births
Living people
Vietnamese footballers
Association football goalkeepers
V.League 1 players
Hanoi FC players